Namgye station is a railway station in Paegam county, Ryanggang province, North Korea, on the Paektusan Ch'ŏngnyŏn Line of the Korean State Railway.

The station, along with the rest of the Hapsu-Paegam section, was opened by the Government Railways of Chosen(朝鮮総督府鉄道) on 1 August 1934.

On 9 October 2006 an underground nuclear test was conducted at P'unggye-ri in Kilju County, causing the closure of the line for 3-4 months.

Ore is the primary commodity shipped from this station.

References

Railway stations in North Korea